Avocent, a business of Vertiv, is an information-technology products manufacturer headquartered in Huntsville, Alabama.  Avocent  formed in 2000 from the merger of the world's two largest manufacturers of KVM (keyboard, video and mouse) equipment: Apex and Cybex Computer Products Corporation.  As of August 2006, the company employed more than 1,800 people worldwide.

On October 6, 2009, it was announced that Emerson Electric would buy Avocent for $1.2 billion USD.  The tender was finalized on December 11, resulting in Avocent becoming part of Emerson Network Power, a division of Emerson Electric. On August 2, 2016, Emerson announced an agreement to sell Network Power to Platinum Equity. On December 1, 2016, Emerson Network Power announced they were rebranding under the name Vertiv and appointing Rob Johnson as CEO.

Product range
Avocent focuses on out-of-band infrastructure management within seven major fields:

 Server management
 Power management
 Service-processor management
 Console-server management
 KVM management
 IPMI for OEM partners
 A wide range of embedded-software
 Desktop management
 ITIL market
 IT service management

Avocent's product development has spanned three eras:

 the growth of the analog KVM switch - paralleling the growth of server architecture in the data center
 the growth of the digital KVM switch - enabling the remote control of geographically dispersed data-centers
 the diversification and “management” phase (revolving around the acquisition of LANDesk (2006) and Touchpaper software (2008) and the capabilities they provide)

Acquisitions
Avocent's history of acquisitions includes:

 2001 - Equinox Systems, the makers of various serial communications devices.
 2002 - 2C Computing, which focused on PCI-bus extension, suitable to remotely connect office users to datacenter-housed PCs.
 2003 - Soronti, Inc., makers of KVM over IP technology.
 2004 - Crystal Link Technologies, OSA Technologies, Inc., and Sonic Mobility, Inc.
 2006 -  and LANDesk Software.
 2008 - Touchpaper Software and Ergo 2000, an LCD rack-based console maker.

References

Companies based in Huntsville, Alabama
Electronics companies of the United States